Bogaje, formerly known as Bogaji (Богаји), is a village in the municipality of Rožaje, Montenegro.

Demographics
According to the 2003 census, it had 222 inhabitants, who identified as a majority of Serbs (59,45%) and minorities of Bosniaks (23,42%), Montenegrins (13,96%) and ethnic Muslims (3,15%).

According to the 2011 census, its population was 198.

References

Populated places in Rožaje Municipality
Serb communities in Montenegro